Infestation is the seventh studio album by American glam metal band Ratt. It is the band's first original effort since their self-titled album in 1999, and the first album since the death of Robbin Crosby in 2002. This is the only album to feature guitarist Carlos Cavazo, formerly of Quiet Riot. The band would enter a turbulent time after the edition of the album, and by 2018 all musicians in it had left the band, except lead singer Stephen Pearcy. It was released by Loud & Proud via Roadrunner Records, a then-sub-label of their longtime home Atlantic Records.

In a February 17, 2010 interview with the Artisan News Service, Stephen Pearcy said of Infestation: "We wanted this to be like something that we would have written right after [1984's] Out of the Cellar. We definitely went back to basics with the mind set of a band with a lot of excitement and some great songs to get out."

In a March 18, 2010 interview with Metalholic Magazine, guitarist Warren DeMartini said of Infestation: "It really exceeded our expectations. Conceptually we kind of wanted to revisit the period of Out of the Cellar and Invasion of Your Privacy. We were sort of loosely trying to shoot for something that could fit between those two records. We were looking for more uptempo ideas and the double leads that Robbin Crosby and I started doing back in 1983."

In the US, the album debuted at No. 30, selling around 14,000 copies, making it Ratt's highest charting album since 1990. The album has since gone on to sell over 50,000 copies in the US.

Track listing

Personnel

Ratt
Stephen Pearcy – lead vocals
Warren DeMartini – lead guitar, backing vocals
Carlos Cavazo – rhythm guitar, backing vocals
Robbie Crane – bass
Bobby Blotzer – drums

Production 
Michael "Elvis" Baskette – producer, mixing, strings arrangements
Dave Holdredge – engineer, mixing, strings arrangements
Jef Moll – digital editing
Ted Jensen – mastering at Sterling Sound, New York City

Charts

References

External links 
Infestation - Ratt's official website

2010 albums
Ratt albums
Roadrunner Records albums